The 2014–15 Iranian Futsal Super League are the 16th season of the Iran Pro League and the 11th under the name Futsal Super League. Dabiri Tabriz are the defending champions. The season will feature 12 teams from the 2013–14 Iranian Futsal Super League and two new teams promoted from the 2013–14 Iran Futsal's 1st Division: Moghavemat Alborz and Ferdosi Mashhad.

Teams

Stadia, locations and Personnel

Number of teams by region

Managerial changes

Before the start of the season

In season

League standings

Positions by round

Results table

Clubs season-progress

Awards 

 Winner: Tasisat Daryaei
 Runners-up: Giti Pasand Isfahan
 Third-Place: Mes Sungun
 Top scorer:  Moslem Rostamiha (Mes Soongoun) (25)
 Best Player:  Alireza Vafaei (Mahan Tandis)
 Best Manager:  Vahid Shamsaei (Tasisat Daryaei)
 Best Goal Keeper:  Mostafa Nazari (Tasisat Daryaei)
 Best Young Player:  Moslem Rostamiha (Mes Soongoun)

See also 
 2014–15 Futsal's 1st Division
 2015 Futsal's 2nd Division
 2014–15 Persian Gulf Cup
 2014–15 Azadegan League
 2014–15 Iran Football's 2nd Division
 2014–15 Iran Football's 3rd Division
 2014–15 Hazfi Cup
 Iranian Super Cup

References

External links 
 Iran Futsal League on PersianLeague 
 Futsal Planet 

Iranian Futsal Super League seasons
1